Mehdi Soltani or Mehdi Soltani Sarvestani is an Iranian actor born on 23 August 1971 in Shiraz, Iran.

Biography 
He holds a PhD in theater acting from the Avignon University in France, and he is currently a faculty member and assistant professor at the Faculty of Performing Arts and Music, University of Tehran.

Filmography

Film 

 The Last Port directed by Hassan Hedayat
 Bright Shadow directed by Hassan Hedayat

 The Queen directed by Mohammad Ali Bashe Ahangar

 Che directed by Ebrahim Hatamikia
 Ghosts directed by Dariush Mehrjui
 All Through The Night directed by Farzad Motamen
 Sohrab's Dream directed by Ali Ghavitan
 Silver Man directed by Mohammad Hossein Latifi

Web 

 Shahrzad directed by Hassan Fathi
 Sleepless directed by Siroos Moghaddam
 Aghazadeh directed by Behrang Tofighi
Amsterdam directed by Masoud Gharagozlu

Television 

 73 Nowroz directed by Hossein Fardrou
 Detective directed by Hassan Hedayat
 The Truth in The Mirror directed by Esmail Mihandoost
 Hananeh directed by Mostafa Yarmahmoudi
 Trial directed by Hassan Hedayat

 The Final Decision directed by Mohsen Shah Mohammadi
Memorable Days directed by Homayoun Shahnavaz
In the Strand of Zayandeh Rud directed by Hassan Fathi
The Wall''' directed by Siroos MoghaddamCrime and Punishment (film) directed by Abbas RafeiPhotography Studio directed by Farzin MehdipourMotherhood directed by Javad AfsharMedina directed by Siroos Moghaddam
Haft Sang directed by Ali Reza BazrafshanPaper House (film) directed by Mahmoud MozeniKimia directed by Javad AfsharUnder The Mother's Feet directed by Behrang TofighiFather directed by Behrang TofighiMaple'' directed by Behrang Tofighi

References

External links 

1971 births
Living people
Iranian male singers
Iranian film directors
Iranian male film actors
Iranian male stage actors
University of Tehran alumni
Academic staff of the University of Tehran
Iranian male television actors